is a 1996 Japanese anime film produced by Shin-Ei Animation. It is the 4th film of the anime series Crayon Shin-chan.

Plot
A prince named Gorman fought with a dragon to save Henderland's princess Mimori, but got captured by the evil magic of Joma and Makao (who are dolls). This is a story that Ms. Yoshinaga narrates to her students. The school then organizes a field trip to Henderland, a theme park based on the same fairy tale. In Henderland, Shinnosuke get separated from his friends and teachers and meets Toppema Mappet, a dancing doll in the restricted section of the park. Shinnosuke winds the doll's key, causing her to move and talk like a human.

They confront with Cre.G.Mad and Chokirin. Chokirin and Toppema end up with a magical fight resulting in Toppema's seeming defeat. Shinnosuke then gets called away by his teacher as he returns home.

That night, Toppema meets Shinnosuke and explains that the tale of Henderland is in fact real and Joma and Makao lead a force of creatures that can control dark magic but are vulnerable to the magic of magical cards, the reason she wants him to help her is because the cards can only be used by living beings. Despite being shown the power of the cards, Shinnosuke refuses to help Topemma. She leaves the cards with him.

Joma and Makao send Snowman to retrieve the magical cards from Shinnosuke through. Snowman arrives at the Saitama Prefecture and pretends to be an educator from the Department Of Education. Snowman gains the trust of all including his parents. Shinnosuke tries to warn those around him to beware Snowman but nobody believes him. Snowman spends the night at Shinnosuke's house and tries to steal the cards but fails as Shinnosuke uses the magical cards. Snowman escape leaving a letter containing tickets to Henderland.

Despite Shinnosuke's pleads, his parents visits Henderland. Before leaving, Shinnosuke's parents visit the bathroom but behave very strangely afterwards. Once they return, his parents demand the Magical Cards before falling into the bathtub as they are revealed to be puppets. Toppema returns and theorizes that Joma and Makao must have captured the real Misae and Hiroshi. Determined to save his parents, Shinnosuke agrees to help Toppema. Toppema explains that she can help him at night, so he spends the entire next day in preparation.

Shinnosuke arrives at Henderland in the evening and is ambushed by Cre.G.Mad, he uses the cards to call Action Kamen, Kantam Robot and Buriburizaemon and transforms into a steam train as Cre.G.Mad transforms into a wolf again. Buriburizaemon comes up with a plan, to create an additional track for Cre.G.Mad to crash into an obstacle. Unfortunately, the plan fails as there was no one to change the way, but at the last minute Toppema appears and changes the wolf's track, causing him to into the water. Cre.G.Mad's t-shirt transforms into Hiroshi, who reveals he was being mind controlled by Joma. The trio head towards Joma and Makao's base but get ambushed by Chokirin.

Toppema and Chokirin once again engage into a magical fight as she defeats Chokirin, but gets weaker and weaker due to exhausting her power and gradually fades and Chokirin's clothing transforms into Misae. The three then travel to Joma and Makao's palace where they are challenged to a dance fight. Joma and Makao perform a dazing ball dance while the Nohara family perform a traditional Japanese dance and win. They are then challenged to a regular card game which they also win.

In a defensive stance, Shinnosuke uses the magical cards and learns how to defeat Joma and Makao. After a great persecution, Joma and Makao are destroyed and the castle begins to crumble. The Nohara family manages to escape the crumbling palace and end up at a beach. Snowman comes there. Just then Princess Mimori comes and converts him to Prince Gorman. She reveals herself to be Toppema and explains that Joma and Makao trapped her and Gorman's souls into the doll and a snowman respectively. A huge celebration is held as peace and prosperity in Henderland is restored.

Cast
Akiko Yajima as Shinnosuke Nohara
Miki Narahashi as Misae Nohara
Keiji Fujiwara as Hiroshi Nohara
Mari Mashiba as Toru Kazama
Teiyū Ichiryūsai as Masao Sato
Tamao Hayashi as Nene Sakurada
Chie Satō as Bo Suzuki
Yuriko Fuchizaki as Toppema Mappet (Doll)
Toshio Furukawa as Snowman
Hideyuki Tanaka as Joma
Hōchū Ōtsuka as Makao
Shinpachi Tsuji as Cre G. Mad
Sanae Miyuki as Chokirin Basta
Yumi Takada as Midori Yoshinaga
Michie Tomizawa as Ume Matsuzaka
Rokurō Naya as Bunta Takakura (principal)
Sōichirō Hoshi as Prince Gorman
Kaneto Shiozawa as Buriburizaemon
Shinya Ōtaki as Kantam Robo
Tesshō Genda as Action Mask
Akiko Hinagata as herself

Soundtrack
The theme song of the film is SIX COLORS BOY sung by Akiko Hinagata, a Japanese model and singer.

Staff 
The names of the staff are listed below:
 Original: Yoshito Usui
 Director: Mitsuru Hongo
 Screenplay: Mitsuru Hongo and Keiichi Hara
 Storyboard: Mitsuru Hongo, Keiichi Hara and Masaaki Yuasa
 Animation director: Katsunori Hara and Noriyuki Tsutsumi
 Cinematography: Hideko Takahashi
 Music: Toshiyuki Arakawa and Shinji Miyazaki
 Sound adjustment: Nobuhiro Shibata, Hisashi Yamamoto, Akiyoshi Tanaka, Nobutaka Taguchi and Takaaki Uchiyama
 Editor: Hajime Okayasu
 Producer: Hitoshi Mogi, Kenji Ōta and Takashi Horiuchi
 Production companies: Shin-Ei Animation, TV Asahi and ADK

Release
It was released in Japan on April 19, 1996. The movie was aired in India on Hungama TV on as Shinchan the Movie: Adventures in Henderland.

See also
 List of Crayon Shin-chan films

References

External links
  

Great Adventure in Henderland
1996 anime films
Films set in Gunma Prefecture
Films directed by Mitsuru Hongo
Films scored by Shinji Miyazaki